Interleukin-1 receptor accessory protein is a protein that in humans is encoded by the IL1RAP gene.

Interleukin 1 induces synthesis of acute phase and proinflammatory proteins during infection, tissue damage, or stress, by forming a complex at the cell membrane with an interleukin 1 receptor and an accessory protein. This gene encodes an interleukin 1 receptor accessory protein. Alternative splicing of this gene results in two transcript variants encoding two different isoforms, one membrane-bound and one soluble.

Interactions
IL1RAP has been shown to interact with TOLLIP and Interleukin 1 receptor, type I.

References

Further reading

External links 
 
 

Proteins